The Lachlander and Condobolin and Western Districts Recorder was a weekly, later bi-weekly, English language newspaper published in Condobolin, New South Wales, Australia beginning around 1895 and continuing until 1952. It absorbed The Condobolin Argus and Lachlan Advertiser and was continued by The Lachlander.

Newspaper history 
The Lachlander and Condobolin and Western Districts Recorder began publication in approximately 1895. It absorbed The Condobolin Argus and Lachlan Advertiser (1892–1900). In 1952 it was continued by The Lachlander, a current publication.

Digitisation 
The Lachlander and Condobolin and Western Districts Recorder has been digitised as part of the Australian Newspapers Digitisation Program of the National Library of Australia.

See also 
 List of newspapers in Australia
 List of newspapers in New South Wales

References

External links 

 

Defunct newspapers published in New South Wales
Newspapers on Trove